SK Hranice is a Czech football club located in Hranice (Přerov District) in the Olomouc Region. It currently plays in Divize E, which is in the Czech Fourth Division.

The club has taken part in the Czech Cup on a number of occasions, reaching the third round in 2001–02, 2002–03 and 2004–05.

Hranice played in the Regional Championship (fifth tier) for two years between 2010 and 2012 before winning promotion back to the Czech Fourth Division in June 2012.

The club was given a state subsidy of 1 million Czech koruna in 2012 to help facilitate the reconstruction of their stadium, which was badly affected by the 1997 Central European flood, due to the stadium's proximity to the Bečva.

References

External links
  

Football clubs in the Czech Republic
Association football clubs established in 1920
Sport in the Olomouc Region
Přerov District